Borlenghi is a surname. Notable people with the surname include:

Ángel Borlenghi (1904–1962), Argentine labor leader and politician
Matt Borlenghi (born 1967), Italian-American actor